Don't Tell the Wife may refer to:
 Don't Tell the Wife (1937 film), an American comedy film
 Don't Tell the Wife (1927 film), an American silent romantic comedy film